Helmut Franz Kelleners (born 29 December 1939 in Moers) is a former race driver from Germany. He has won the Spa 24 Hours (1968 and 1970) and the 24 Hours Nürburgring (1972). From 1980 to 1981, Kelleners formed a successful partnership with Italian driver Umberto Grano, securing three consecutive editions of the European Touring Car Championship at the wheel of a BMW.

His son Ralf Kelleners is also a race car driver.

Career
 Spa 24 Hours
 Joest Racing
 1000 km Nürburgring
 24 Hours Nürburgring
 1970 24 Hours of Le Mans
 1969 24 Hours of Le Mans

External links
http://www.kelleners-sport.com/

German racing drivers
Living people
24 Hours of Le Mans drivers
24 Hours of Spa drivers
World Sportscar Championship drivers
European Touring Car Championship drivers
1939 births
People from Moers
Sportspeople from Düsseldorf (region)
Racing drivers from North Rhine-Westphalia

Nürburgring 24 Hours drivers